Toby Hessian (born 17 June 1969) is a British lightweight rower. He was three times world champion; twice with the lightweight men's four (in 1991 in Vienna and in 1992 in Montreal) and once with the lightweight men's eight (in 1994 in Indianapolis).

References

1969 births
Living people
British male rowers
World Rowing Championships medalists for Great Britain